Antrodia cinnamomea is a fungus species described as new to science in 1995. It causes brown heart rot of the aromatic tree Cinnamomum kanehirae. It is used in Taiwanese traditional medicine as a supposed remedy for cancer, hypertension, and hangover.  The annual market is worth over $100 million (US) in Taiwan alone. The 32.15 Mb genome containing 9,254 genes has been sequenced.

Antrodia cinnamomea has been found to produce anti-obesogenic, anti-inflammatory and antidiabetic effects in high-fat diet-fed mice.

References

Further reading
Chang, Tun-Tschu, and Wang, Wu-Rong. "Basidiomatal formation of Antrodia cinnamomea on artificial agar media." Botanical Bulletin of Academia Sinica 46 (2005).

Chang, Tun-Tschu, and Wen-Neng Chou. "Antrodia cinnamomea reconsidered and A. salmonea sp. nov. on Cunninghamia konishii in Taiwan." Botanical Bulletin of Academia Sinica 45 (2004).

Fomitopsidaceae
Fungi described in 1995
Fungi of Asia